Hu Ni (born 9 February 1981) is a Chinese synchronized swimmer who competed in the 2004 Summer Olympics.

Personal life
Hu Ni married badminton player Zhang Jun in 2006. Their son was born in 2009. (Hu Ni's teammate Wang Na married Zhang Jun's former doubles partner Cai Yun, whom Zhang later also coached, in 2010.)

References

1981 births
Living people
Chinese synchronized swimmers
Olympic synchronized swimmers of China
Synchronized swimmers at the 2004 Summer Olympics
Synchronized swimmers from Shanxi
Sportspeople from Taiyuan
Nanjing Sport Institute alumni